The German Wine Queen is the representative of the German wine industry. The Wine Queen is supported by two princesses, forming together the German Wine Ambassadors. She is elected, usually in the Palatine town of Neustadt an der Weinstraße, for a period of one year. The title is competed for by the regional wine queens of the thirteen German wine regions producing "quality" wine.

The 74rd German Wine Queen is Katrin Lang from Ebringen in the Baden region; she was chosen on 30 September 2022 for the period 2022/2023.

History

Beginnings 
In 1931 the first German wine region, the Palatinate, crowned its own wine queen. The idea for this "Palatine Wine Queen" came from publisher, Daniel Meininger. At his suggestion, Ruth Bachrodt (later Theysohn) was elected. She came from Pirmasens in Western Palatinate where, in fact, no wine is produced.  Her successor, Cecily Seitz, was elected in 1932 by popular request. In 1933, control of the festival was taken over by Nazi leaders. Until the beginning of the Second World War, the official Gau Photographer sought out the "prettiest young woman associated with the wine industry" on behalf of the very popular Gauleiter of the Palatinate, Joseph Buerckel.

Because the Palatine Wine Queen was Germany's only wine queen, she automatically represented the German wine industry in general as well as the Palatine wine region until 1939, and then again, from 1947 until 1949. In 1949, there was still only one competition but, following the election, Elisabeth Kuhn, later Gies from Diedesfeld, was officially nominated as the German Wine Queen, so that she officially became both the Palatine and German Wine Queen in the same year.

Criteria for candidates 
Since 1950, the German Wine Queen has been elected in a separate competition. Each year, every recognized German wine region selects its local wine queen. From these regional wine queens, the German Wine Queen is chosen the following year. Until 1999, it was a condition that the candidates had to be single – they could be neither married nor divorced – and had to come from a family of winemakers. Since 2000, the candidates who apply have only had to have "clear and strong ties with German wines," demonstrated by "appropriate wine-related training and / or a family relationship with the local wine production and / or the qualification as an area wine queen". In addition, applicants must be at least 18 years old on the day of election.

Changing requirements 
For about 30 years the wine queens represented the traditional image of the pretty and virtuous maiden in traditional costume, the only significant change being in 1966 when the original sceptre was replaced by a wine glass. As the newspaper, Süddeutsche Zeitung, said in 1950, the candidates were "true daughters of the vineyards, they were of powerful build, healthy and wholesome". Their assessment, at that time, included performing a waltz and giving a speech. Until the late 1950s, the ceremonial duties of the German Wine Queen were mainly restricted to domestic markets. There were appearances at wine festivals during Green Week and at social events such as the awarding of the German Wine Culture Prize. Trips abroad, such as to Belgium (Irmgard Mohler) or to Spain (Wilma Seyer, later Scholl) remained the exception. However, the then Foreign Minister, Heinrich von Brentano, recognized the diplomatic potential for the image of the young federal republic, when he presented Wilma Seyer at the "Diplomats' Wine Festival" in Eberbach Monastery that he had initiated. By the following year, the Palatine, later German, Wine Queen, Christel Koch, traveled to the US, the first time a wine queen from Germany had done so.

In the 1980s the image of the Wine Queen in public began to fundamentally change, especially with the election of personalities such as Karin Molitor (1982/83) and Petra Mayer (1988/89). In 1981 the wearing of the dirndl, the traditional dress that had been obligatory for photo calls, was scrapped. From the 1990s, it changed from being a role for young women vintners or those who were linked to the wine trade, to being a career springboard into politics (Julia Klöckner), into marketing (Katja Schweder, Evelyn Schmidt), into gastronomy (Carina Dostert) or starting small businesses (Sandra Hake, Sylvia Benzinger). Selection is no longer based so much on good looks and dancing skills today; more important, in addition to a knowledge of oenology and winemaking technology, quick wit and eloquence are required as well as proficiency in foreign languages and a knowledge of the export business. As a result, a preparatory seminar for the candidates was introduced in Neustadt an der Weinstraße in 2009.

Selection

Venue 

The German Wine Queen competition is arranged by the German Wine Institute (DWI) whose head office is in Bodenheim. It is traditionally held in the Saalbau festival hall in Neustadt on the occasion of the German Wine Harvest Festival on the Friday of the second festival week in October. However, the venue can be changed on important occasions. In addition to Neustadt an der Weinstraße, other venues have been:

 1952 Freiburg im Breisgau
 1954 Heilbronn
 1957 Würzburg
 1960 Bad Dürkheim
 1963, 2016 Mainz
 1966 Stuttgart
 1969 Offenburg
 1972 Stuttgart
 1975 Stuttgart
 1984 Trier
 1988 Berlin
 1993 Bad Neuenahr-Ahrweiler
 1998 Freyburg (Unstrut)
 2006 Dresden (800th anniversary of the city, the most important place in the Saxon wine region)
 2009 Heilbronn
In May 2009, the DWI and the Mayor of Neustadt an der Weinstraße signed a contract that stipulates Neustadt as the coronation venue until 2020. This rule may be waived no more than three times per decade, "to give other German wine regions the opportunity to host the coronation in order to respond to special events and celebrations."
 2013 Offenburg, Oberrheinhalle; preliminary round on 7 September; final round for the six remaining regional queens on 13 September.

Election process 
In recent times the election process has changed several times. In 2009, for the first time, the competition was broadcast on a large screen outside the venue. In the first round, 12 of the 13 regional wine queens faced a rigorous oral examination with questions about viticultural and winemaking techniques, as well as wine labelling, packaging and marketing, from a panel of 80 judges. In addition each candidate had to assist – in English – a "confused foreign tourist" visiting Germany's wine country. Only six candidates went through to the second and final round, a televised "gala" attended by 1,300 guests and watched by more than a million viewers, where the 18- to 25-year-olds had to demonstrate they could field questions on wine-making spontaneously. After the competition, the newly elected wine queen and her two princesses were invited by the Minister for Agriculture and the town of Heilbronn to a festival banquet, the so-called "After-Show Party".

During their one-year term of office, the Wine Queen and Wine Princesses advertise German wine at trade fairs, wine festivals and other events. The Wine Queen, in particular, is the ambassador of German wine-growers and their products at some 250 appearances in Germany and abroad.

Results

German wine queens since 1949 
The following table lists all German wine queens since 1949:

Frequency of winners by wine region

References

Literature

External links 

 Official website of the German Wine Queen

German wine
Neustadt an der Weinstraße